A throw-in is a method of restarting play in a game of association football when the ball has exited the side of the field of play.  It is governed by Law 15 of The Laws of the Game. In Scotland it is known as a "shy".

Award
When the ball goes out of play past the touch-line to the side of the pitch, a throw-in is awarded to the opponents of the player who last touched the ball, whether deliberately or accidentally.

Procedure
The throw-in is taken from the point where the ball crossed the touch-line, either on the ground or in the air, though typically a referee will tolerate small discrepancies between the position where the ball crossed the touch-line and the position of the throw-in.

At the moment of delivering the ball, the thrower must face the field of play. The thrower must have part of each foot on the touch-line or on the ground outside the touch-line, and use both hands to deliver the ball from behind and over the head.

The ball becomes in play as soon as it enters the field of play.

A goal cannot be scored directly from a throw-in; if a player throws the ball directly into their own goal without any other player touching it, the result is a corner kick to the opposing side. Likewise an offensive goal cannot be scored directly from a throw in; the result, in this case, is a goal kick for the defending team.

A player may not be penalised for an offside offence when receiving the ball directly from a throw-in. Skillful attackers can sometimes take advantage of this rule by getting behind the last defender(s) to receive the throw-in and having a clear path to goal.

The optimal release angle for attaining maximum distance is about 30 degrees above the horizontal, according to researchers at Brunel University. According to the study, players are able to throw the ball with greater release velocity for lower angles. The optimal angle would be 45 degrees if the release velocity did not depend on the angle of throw, if the ball were thrown from ground level instead of above the head, and if there was not air drag.

Infringements

Opposing players failing to respect the required distance (2 m) before the ball is in play, or otherwise unfairly distracts or impedes the thrower may receive a caution (yellow card) for unsporting behaviour. If the throw-in has already been taken when the referee stops play for this offence, an indirect free kick is awarded.

If the thrower fails to deliver the ball per the required procedure, or delivers it from a point other than where the ball left the field of play, the throw-in is awarded to the opposing team. This is commonly known as a "foul throw".

It is an infringement for the thrower to touch the ball a second time before it has been touched by another player; this is punishable by an indirect free kick to the opposing team from where the offence occurred, unless the second touch was also a more serious handling offence, in which case it is punishable by a direct free kick or penalty kick.

If a player appears to take a throw-in but suddenly leaves it to a teammate to take, the player is cautioned for delaying the restart of play. Any player who excessively delays the restart of play is also cautioned.

A goalkeeper cannot handle a ball thrown directly by a teammate. This cannot be circumvented by the keeper using the feet first before handling the ball. If this infringement occurs within the goalkeeper's penalty area, an indirect free kick is awarded. If the infringement occurs outside the goalkeeper's penalty area, a direct free kick is awarded.

History

Before 1863

A detailed description of an early predecessor of the throw-in is recorded in the novel Tom Brown's School Days, published in 1857 but based on the author's experiences at Rugby School from 1834 to 1842:  Several features of this passages are notable:
 possession is awarded to the first player to touch the ball after it goes out of play (this is the origin of the term "touch" for the area beyond the field of play)
 the ball must be played "straight out" (i.e. perpendicular to the touch-line)
 the player must "knock" or "strike" the ball back into play
The 1851 rules of Rugby School describe a similar procedure, except that the ball is thrown in rather than struck or hit; this is the ancestor of the line-out in rugby union: 
Similar "throw-in" laws are found in the Cambridge rules of 1856, the Sheffield rules of 1858, the laws of Melbourne FC (1859), and indeed the original FA laws of 1863 (see below).

Other codes had a kick-in rather than a throw-in.  These included the "Foot-Ball Club" of Edinburgh (1833), Harrow football (1858), Barnes FC (1862), Blackheath FC (1862), and the later Cambridge rules from November 1863. Some of these laws permitted the ball to be kicked in any direction, while others required that it be perpendicular to the touch-line.  At Harrow, the ball could be kicked in by "any of the bystanders", as well as any player.

The Eton field game's rules, as recorded in 1847, specified that a throw-in and a "bully" (scrummage) should be used alternately, while its 1857 rules used the bully exclusively.

The FA laws of 1863

At its second meeting, on 10 November 1863, the Football Association agreed that "when the ball is out of bounds it should be kicked or thrown in straight by the person who should first touch it down". The first draft of the laws of the game reflected this decision, but the option of a kick-in was removed before the final version of the laws was adopted on 8 December 1863.

This left the 1863 throw-in law very similar to those of Rugby School and Sheffield described earlier: 
The throw-in from the 1863 rules features several differences from the throw-in in modern association football:

 possession is awarded to the first player to touch the ball after it goes out of play (in the modern game, it is awarded against the team last touching the ball before it goes out of play)
 the ball must be thrown perpendicular to the touch-line (in the modern game, the ball may be thrown in any direction)
 the manner in which the ball is thrown is not specified (in the modern game, the ball must be thrown with two hands from above the head)

Subsequent developments

Unity with Sheffield rules
In 1867, the laws of the Sheffield Football Association awarded the throw-in against the team kicking the ball out of play. In 1868, these Sheffield rules were revised further to award a kick-in instead of a throw-in.  It continued to be awarded against the team who kicked the ball into touch, and could now be played in any direction.

In 1873, Nottingham Forest F.C. proposed a change in the FA's throw-in law to make it more similar to the Sheffield rule:  the throw-in would be awarded against the team who kicked out of play, and it could optionally be replaced by a kick-in.   Only part of the suggested change was approved by the FA's meeting:  the throw-in would be awarded against the team who kicked the ball out of play, but it could not be replaced by a kick-in.  It was still required to be thrown in perpendicular to the touch-line.

At the FA meetings of 1875 and 1876, the Sheffield clubs attempted to introduce their kick-in into the FA's laws. Both times the change was narrowly rejected after heated debate.  Matters came to a head in 1877. At the regular meeting of the FA, in February, the Sheffield Association again proposed its kick-in rule, while Clydesdale FC proposed a compromise rule which retained the throw-in but allowed it to go in any direction. The Sheffield Association agreed to withdraw its own proposal in favour of Clydesdale FC's compromise. However, even this compromise proposal was rejected, "to the intense regret of those who desired one common code of rules". This rejection prompted the publication of a pseudonymous letter in The Sportsman decrying the "hasty, ill-judged decision ... bringing the Football Association into disrepute", and denying that it represented "the general body of [Football] Association players – even of those in London". A subsequent extraordinary general meeting of the FA was held on 17 April, at which the Clydesdale amendment was reconsidered and passed. As a result of this change in the FA laws, the Sheffield Association held a meeting one week later at which it agreed to abandon its own rules and accept the FA laws.

As a result of these developments, the throw-in of 1877 looked quite similar to today's: it was awarded against the team who kicked the ball out of play, and it could be thrown in any direction.  There was no restriction on the technique by which the ball could be thrown; players would throw the ball great distances using only one arm. It is reported that the England international Norman Bailey was capable of propelling the ball "from the centre of the ground into the goal mouth".

Unity with Scotland

The International Football Conference of December 1882 addressed discrepancies between the laws used by the English, Scottish, Welsh and Irish football associations. One of the topics settled at this conference was the throw-in:  in April 1882, at the proposal of the Third Lanark club, the Scottish FA changed its rugby-style throw-in law (i.e. one-handed, perpendicular to the touchline) to the version in use today, i.e. thrown in any direction, but with two hands over the head; while the English laws, as described above, allowed the ball to be thrown with one hand in any direction.  As a result of the conference, the Scottish version of the throw-in law was accepted.  This new throw-in law, requiring the ball to be thrown from over the head with two hands, was formally adopted by the FA in 1883.

Scoring a goal from a throw-in

The laws of the game have never permitted a goal to be scored directly from a throw-in by the attacking team. In 1882, a change in the laws, introduced by Nicholas Lane Jackson of Finchley FC and Morton Betts of Old Harrovians FC, made it possible to score an own goal directly from a throw-in. This possibility was removed in 1898.

In 2002, Aston Villa goalkeeper Peter Enckelman scored an own goal from a team-mate's throw back to him when he miss-controlled the ball but appeared to touch it slightly with his foot before it crossed the line though Enkelman denied this. The incident received widespread media attention due to it occurring in an important Birmingham derby match in the Premier League.

Offside from a throw-in

Under the original laws of 1863, it was not possible to be offside from a throw-in; however, since the ball was required to be thrown in at right-angles to the touch-line, it would have been unusual for a player to gain significant advantage from being ahead of the ball.  After the ball was permitted to be thrown in any direction in 1877, the very next year (1878) a new law was introduced to allow a player to be offside from a throw-in. This situation lasted until 1920, when the law was altered to prevent a player being offside from a throw-in.

Position of thrower's feet
In 1895, the thrower was required to "stand on the touch line". In 1896, it was clarified that the thrower could have "any part of both feet on the [touch] line". In 1925, this was changed to "both feet on the ground outside the touch-line", but in 1932 it reverted to "both feet on or outside the touch-line". In 1937, the requirement was once again changed to "part of each foot shall be either on or outside the touchline". In 1960, the wording was further refined to "part of each foot shall be either on the touch-line or on the ground outside the touch-line".

Manner of throwing
In 1895, the player taking the throw-in was required to face the field of play. In 1965, the ball was required to be thrown from "behind and over" the head of the thrower.

Position of opponents
Since 2005, opponents have been forbidden from approaching closer than 2 metres to the player taking the throw-in.  This change was made because FIFA perceived "an increasing trend for an opponent to stand immediately in front of the thrower at a throw-in, with his feet virtually on the touch-line", with the result that "the thrower is being impeded from completing the throw-in".  There was also a concern about the possibility of "a confrontational situation developing between both players."

Double touch
Since 1866, the player taking the throw-in has been forbidden to touch the ball again until it has been touched by another player.

Defunct requirements

In 1866, players were forbidden from playing the ball before it had touched the ground. This requirement was removed when the Clydesdale throw-in law was adopted in 1877.

In 1871 a law-change introduced by Wanderers FC forbade players from playing the ball until it had travelled at least six yards. This requirement was dropped when the Scottish throw-in law was adopted in 1883.

Punishment for violations of the throw-in law
In 1882, an indirect free-kick was awarded for any violation of the throw-in law. In 1931, on a proposal by the Irish Football Association, this was changed to an award of the throw-in the opposing team (except for a violation of the double-touch rule, which remained punishable by an indirect free-kick).

In 1966, it was specified that opponents who "dance about or gesticulate in a way calculated to distract or impede the thrower" should be cautioned for ungentlemanly conduct. In 1997, this wording was updated to punish with a yellow card an opponent who "unfairly distracts or impedes the thrower" for "unsporting behaviour". In 2016, the same punishment was applied to an opponent who approaches closer than the minimum 2 metre distance; it was further specified than an indirect free-kick must be awarded if the ball has already been thrown in when the referee stops play to deal with the offence.

Name
The name "throw-in" is first found in the laws of 1891.

Summary

Unusual throw-ins

An uncommon but effective technique for delivering a faster than usual throw is the flip throw (notably employed in recent years by, among others, Estonian player Risto Kallaste, and Icelander Steinþór Freyr Þorsteinsson): in it the player, during the run-up, plants the ball on the ground, flips over it, and uses the momentum gained from the flip to increase the velocity of the ball. British footballers Dave Challinor and Andy Legg are among the previous record holders. Iranian defender Milad Mohammadi made a failed attempt at a flip throw in the group-stage match against Spain at the 2018 FIFA World Cup; two years later, compatriot Nader Mohammadi scored using the technique in a domestic match (the goalkeeper touched the ball on its way in).

Invention of the manoeuvre has been credited to Tony Hyndman, son of coach Schellas Hyndman, who had learned tumbling from his gymnast mother.

References

External links

FIFA Laws of the Game – Law 15)
Q&A on Throw Ins(from AskTheRef.com)

Laws of association football
Terminology used in multiple sports
Association football terminology
Australian rules football terminology
Basketball terminology
Rugby union terminology